Professor Sartaj Kumar Sahni (born July 22, 1949, in Pune, India) is a computer scientist based in the United States, and is one of the pioneers in the field of data structures. He is a distinguished professor in the Department of Computer and Information Science and Engineering at the University of Florida.

Education
Sahni received his BTech degree in electrical engineering from the Indian Institute of Technology Kanpur. Following this, he undertook his graduate studies at Cornell University in the USA, earning a PhD degree in 1973, under the supervision of Ellis Horowitz.

Research and publications
Sahni has published over 280 research papers and written 15 textbooks. His research publications are on the design and analysis of efficient algorithms, data structures, parallel computing, interconnection networks, design automation, and medical algorithms.

With his advisor Ellis Horowitz, Sahni wrote two widely used textbooks, Fundamentals of Computer Algorithms and Fundamentals of Data Structures. He has also written highly cited research papers on the NP-completeness of approximately solving certain optimization problems, on open shop scheduling, on parallel algorithms for matrix multiplication and their application in graph theory, and on improved exponential time exact algorithms for the subset sum problem, among his many other research results.

Awards and honors
In 1997, Sahni was awarded the IEEE Computer Society's Taylor L. Booth Education Award and in 2003 he was awarded the IEEE Computer Society McDowell Award. Sahni was also awarded the 2003 Karl V. Karlstrom Outstanding Educator Award of the Association for Computing Machinery.

Prof. Sahni is a member of the European Academy of Sciences. He was elected as a Fellow of the Institute of Electrical and Electronics Engineers in 1988, and of the Association for Computing Machinery in 1996; he is also a fellow of the American Association for the Advancement of Science, elected in 1995. He is a Distinguished Alumnus of the Indian Institute of Technology, Kanpur.

Sahni was given the Honorary Professor Award of Asia University (Taiwan) in 2009.

Volunteer activities
He is serving as editor-in-chief of ACM Computing Surveys.

References

External links
 Sartaj K. Sahni home page
 

1949 births
Living people
IIT Kanpur alumni
Cornell University alumni
Indian computer scientists
American computer scientists
Theoretical computer scientists
Computer science writers
Indian emigrants to the United States
Fellows of the American Association for the Advancement of Science
Fellows of the Association for Computing Machinery
Fellow Members of the IEEE
University of Florida faculty